For the reptiles of New Zealand, see:

Dinosaurs and other Mesozoic reptiles of New Zealand
Geckos of New Zealand
Oligosoma, a genus of skinks
Tuatara, incorrectly referred to as a "living dinosaur".

The New Zealand mosasaur has been named Moanasaurus, and was one of the largest mosasaurs in the world. The New Zealand plesiosaur has been named Mauisaurus.

See also
Fauna of New Zealand

External links
 Conservation Status of New Zealand Reptiles, 2021
 New Zealand reptiles and frogs, Department of Conservation